Kelly Tan (born 26 October 1993) is a Malaysian professional golfer who competes on the LPGA Tour.

Tan is a former member of the Malaysian junior national team.

Tan earned her LPGA Tour card for 2014 via qualifying school.

Tan qualified for the 2016 Summer Olympics.

Tan's first professional win came at the 2019 Florida's Natural Charity Classic on the Symetra Tour.

Amateur wins
2010 Selangor Amateur, Sarawak Amateur, Asian Schools Games
2011 Selangor Amateur Open, Malaysian Ladies Amateur
2012 Sabah Amateur Open, Santi Cup, Johor Amateur Open, TSM Challenge
2013 Sarawak Amateur, Malaysian Amateur Open

Source:

Professional wins

Symetra Tour wins
2019 Florida's Natural Charity Classic

Results in LPGA majors
Results not in chronological order.

CUT = missed the half-way cut
NT = no tournament
T = tied

Team appearances
Espirito Santo Trophy (representing Malaysia): 2012

References

External links

Malaysian female golfers
LPGA Tour golfers
Olympic golfers of Malaysia
Golfers at the 2016 Summer Olympics
Golfers at the 2020 Summer Olympics
Asian Games competitors for Malaysia
Golfers at the 2010 Asian Games
Southeast Asian Games medalists in golf
Southeast Asian Games bronze medalists for Malaysia
Competitors at the 2009 Southeast Asian Games
Malaysian people of Chinese descent
1993 births
Living people